Stoak is a civil parish in Cheshire West and Chester, England. It contains eight buildings that are recorded in the National Heritage List for England as designated listed buildings.  Of these, one is listed at Grade II*, the middle grade, and the others are at Grade II.  Apart from the village of Stoak, the parish is rural.  The Shropshire Union Canal passes through the parish, and five of the listed buildings are bridges crossing the canal.  The other listed buildings are the parish church, a sundial in the churchyard, and a farmhouse.

Key

Buildings

See also
Listed buildings in Backford
Listed buildings in Croughton
Listed buildings in Little Stanney
Listed buildings in Thornton-le-Moors
Listed buildings in Wervin

References
Citations

Sources

 

Listed buildings in Cheshire West and Chester
Lists of listed buildings in Cheshire
Cheshire West and Chester